Tando Masti Khan railway station is located in Tando Masti Khan village, Khairpur district of Sindh province of Pakistan.

See also
 List of railway stations in Pakistan
 Pakistan Railways

References

External links

Railway stations in Khairpur District
Railway stations on Karachi–Peshawar Line (ML 1)